Skurup Municipality (Skurups kommun) is a municipality in Skåne County in southern Sweden. Its seat is located in the town Skurup. It is considered part of Greater Malmö by Statistics Sweden.

The present municipality was formed in 1971 when the market town (köping) of Skurup was merged with Rydsgård and Vemmenhög.

Localities
There are 4 urban areas (also called a Tätort or locality) in Skurup Municipality. In the table they  are listed according to the size of the population as of December 31, 2005. The municipal seat is in bold characters.

Places of interest 
 Svaneholm Castle

Twin cities
 Maszlow, Poland
 Franzburg-Richtenberg, Germany

References
Statistics Sweden

External links

Skurup - Official site
Coat of arms

Municipalities of Skåne County